Velga is a Latvian feminine given name. Its name day is August 13.

Notable people named Velga
Velga Krile (1945–1991), Latvian poet
Velga Vīlipa (1940–2018), Latvian actress

References 

Latvian feminine given names
Feminine given names